Rajneesh Chopra (born 30 June 1974) is an Indian former cricketer. He played seven first-class matches for Delhi between 1995 and 1999.

See also
 List of Delhi cricketers

References

External links
 

1974 births
Living people
Indian cricketers
Delhi cricketers
Cricketers from Delhi